I, Fatty is a novel by American writer Jerry Stahl  published in 2004.  The book is a fictionalized autobiography of Roscoe "Fatty" Arbuckle, the famous silent film comedian, and probes his early life in vaudeville, his rise to fame in the movies, and his crash into infamy following a false murder accusation (and three trials and eventual acquittal).

References

2004 American novels
Works by Jerry Stahl
Novels about actors
Hollywood novels
Novels set in the 1910s
Novels set in the 1920s
Novels set in the 1930s
Cultural depictions of actors